Sergei Vitalyevich Gurenko (or Syarhey Hurenka; , ; ; born 30 September 1972) is a Belarusian football coach and former player.

Club career
In 1995, Gurenko was transferred to Russian Premier League side Lokomotiv Moscow. His outstanding skills and determination lead him to become one of the leaders of his side, and eventually he left his team for further challenge. In 1999, he became a player of Italian Serie A side A.S. Roma, which cost the club 10.58 billion Italian lire, but couldn't establish himself well there, playing in seven games for his club.

In the 2000–01 season he played for Spanish La Liga side Real Zaragoza, but didn't do well there too, participating in just 11 games and for the 2001–02 season he returned to Italy, playing for Parma AC, making 11 appearances that season.

On 8 December 2008, he moved back to Belarus to play for Dinamo Minsk and retired on 21 August 2009.

In 2014, he briefly joined Belarusian Second League club Partizan Minsk.

On 22 July 2006, Gurenko passed the milestone of 500 competitive games on the highest level, and became a member of the elite club of Sergei Aleinikov. In total, he has played in 612 matches for top league clubs.

International career
Gurenko debuted for the Belarusia national team on 5 May 1994, in a friendly against Ukraine and would eventually become the team captain. He ended his national team duty after a row with the manager during preparation for the WC qualifier against Moldova on 3 September 2005.

He is the second most capped Belarusian player, with 80 caps.

As part of the national team won 2002 LG Cup.

Coaching career
After release of Slavoljub Muslin by Dinamo Minsk on 27 July 2009, Gurenko was named new Assistant Coach in the team of new head coach Kirill Alshevskiy. On 21 August 2009, Dinamo Minsk's club officials promoted him to the head coaching position. He replaced Kirill Alshevski.

In 2013, he worked as Slavoljub Muslin's assistant at Russian top division club FC Krasnodar.

On 4 February 2014, Gurenko was appointed an assistant manager at PFC Spartak Nalchik, where he reunited with former Lokomotiv teammate Khasanbi Bidzhiyev, appointed earlier as a head coach.

Career statistics
Scores and results list Belarus' goal tally first, score column indicates score after each Gurenko goal.

Honours
Neman Grodno
Belarusian Cup: 1992–93

Lokomotiv Moscow
Russian Premier League: 2004
Russian Cup: 1995–96, 1996–97, 2006–07
Russian Super Cup: 2005

Real Zaragoza
Copa del Rey: 2000–01

Parma
Coppa Italia: 2001–02

References

External links
 Sergei Gurenko international appearances list
 Sergei Gurenko in Italy and Spain 
 

1972 births
Living people
Sportspeople from Grodno
Belarusian footballers
Association football central defenders
Belarus international footballers
Belarusian expatriate footballers
Expatriate footballers in Russia
Expatriate footballers in Italy
Expatriate footballers in Spain
Belarusian expatriate sportspeople in Russia
Belarusian expatriate sportspeople in Spain
Belarusian Premier League players
Russian Premier League players
Serie A players
La Liga players
FC Neman Grodno players
FC Lokomotiv Moscow players
A.S. Roma players
Real Zaragoza players
Parma Calcio 1913 players
Piacenza Calcio 1919 players
FC Dinamo Minsk players
FC Partizan Minsk players
Belarusian football managers
Belarusian expatriate football managers
Expatriate football managers in Lithuania
FC Torpedo Zhodino managers
FC Dinamo Minsk managers
FK Riteriai managers
FC Shakhtyor Soligorsk managers
Belarusian expatriate sportspeople in Italy
Belarusian expatriate sportspeople in Lithuania
Belarusian expatriate sportspeople in Serbia
Belarusian expatriate sportspeople in Belgium